The Club of Four was an alliance of four European truck manufacturers: Saviem, Volvo, DAF, and Magirus-Deutz.

Officially called the Société Européenne de Travaux et de Développement (ETD), the team was based in Paris. Founded to develop a shared range of light trucks, its main success was a shared cab design. Cabs can be one of the most expensive parts of a truck to design and build; the alliance allowed one cab design to be shared among four different truck manufacturers, allowing economies of scale. In 1978, Saviem was merged with Berliet to create Renault Véhicules Industriels (RVI), but the new company continued as a member of the Club. Magirus-Deutz became part of Iveco.

The cab was used on a wide range of different trucks. It was even used on Mack trucks in the USA. It remained in production for almost a quarter of a century. Although initially intended for medium trucks it was also used on light trucks, even the 6-tonne Magirus 90M6FK.

History

Cab design usage

Volvo

At first, Volvo used the cab most; adopting it across the F4 (F406/F407/F408) and F6 (F609/F610/F611/F612/F613/F614) ranges of trucks. The first to be sold in the UK was the F7 range of trucks, which replaced Volvo's old F86. These Club of Four cabs continued until 1985-1986 by which time the Volvo FL was being produced with new Volvo cabs, although the new FL6 was superficially similar to the Club of Four.

Volvo's Club of Four cabs had to be reinforced to meet strict Swedish safety standards, which made their weight less competitive. The Club of Four cab was also used on the CH230, a series of specially built narrow-bodied, larger engined truck to fit Switzerland's restrictive rules on size and weight. The first CH230 used the Club of Four cab atop the F89 chassis, with the narrower F86 front axle and the N10 rear axle. It was introduced in 1977. In 1980 the next iteration appeared, now using the F7 cab atop the F10/F12's chassis. It continued in production until 1986, when it was replaced by the FS10.

Volvo's membership of the Club of Four was a major influence on its decision to shift truck manufacturing to Gent, in Belgium (because imports from Volvo's Gothenburg factory to the EEC were, at that time, subject to heavy import duties).

Saviem and Berliet (later Renault)

At first, H/HB-series trucks (up to 26 tonnes) and J-series light trucks (9–13 tonnes) were fitted with the Club of Four cab. Later, the cab was also used on the heavier G series, as well as the lighter JK65/75/85 trucks and the Renault C and S series. This series was briefly sold as "Saviem" trucks in Britain, but changed to Renault badging in September 1979 as part of a push to establish this brand in the British commercial vehicles' market.

RVI trucks branded as Berliet carried the Club of Four cab as well in 1978–1979.

The Club of Four cab was later adapted to Renault Midliner, Maxter, and Manager trucks.

Renault C-series (including CLM, CBB and CBH, and also GBC 180) construction and military vehicles with conventional cabins adapted Club of Four cab as well. Renault Sherpa Medium family derived from CB-series is still in production (2019).

Magirus-Deutz (later Iveco)

Magirus intended to use the Club of Four cab on light trucks; this was inherited by Iveco as they took over the Magirus company before the cab entered production in Germany. The Iveco-built version was originally sold as the Magirus-Deutz MK range in Germany and certain other markets, this became the Magirus-Iveco in the early 1980s.

Iveco, having owned Magirus since 1975, sold the truck as a Magirus or Iveco-Magirus (with slightly changed designations) until they retired the Magirus badge entirely. From then on, Iveco marketed the Club of Four truck - still as the "MK" - directly under their own name. Production came to an end in 1992 as it was replaced by the new Iveco Eurocargo, although limited production of crew cabs for special applications continued a little while longer.

DAF

DAF started using the Club of Four cab in 1975 on the DAF F700 and F900; it was later used on the F500, F1100, F1300, and F1500. DAF merged with Leyland in 1987, and replaced its Club of Four cabs with Leyland cabs.

Mack

American Mack also used the Club of Four cabin, thanks to their linkup with Renault (who purchased 10 percent of Mack in 1979). These competed in the Class 6 and Class 7 medium-duty weight categories. Built by RVI in France, it was sold as the Mack Mid-Liner or Manager. Originally it was available in MS200 or MS300 models, fitted with 5.5 or 8.8 litre turbocharged diesel inline-six engines respectively. The MS300 was also available as a tractor unit. The Mack Mid-liner range was replaced in 2001 by the new Mack Freedom, also built by Renault. A heavier duty version with the less powerful engine was introduced in the mid-1980s, called the MS250.

For the North American market a bonneted version was also developed. This was called the CS (for "Conventional Styling") and appeared in 1985. As with the cab-over model, a tractor version (CS300T) was made available a little later.

References

Trucks
Iveco
Renault trucks
Volvo Trucks
DAF Trucks vehicles
Saviem
Mack Trucks